The European Golf Association (EGA) is a non-profit organisation based in Epalinges, Switzerland, which was founded in 1937 in Luxembourg.

The EGA's main activity consists of coordinating and co-organizing European amateur golf championships. It functions in coordination with its 49 member federations. It also is the body responsible for the implementation of the World Handicap System in Europe.

In reaction to the 2022 Russian invasion of Ukraine, in March 2022 the European Golf Association announced that it would not allow teams, individuals, and officials from Russia and Belarus to participate in EGA events in 2022, and that no EGA events were planned to take place in Russia or Belarus.

History and function
The European Golf Association was founded in Luxembourg on 20 November 1937.

The EGA is governed by three committees:
Executive Committee
Championship Committee
Handicapping and Course Rating Committee

In addition to coordinating and co-organizing amateur golf tournaments and international matches, the EGA also reviews the European aspects of the Rules of Golf and the European amateur status as defined by The R&A Rules Limited, being concerned only by matters of an international character.

The association is the governing body responsible for the implementation of the World Handicap System in Europe; it is particularly responsible for reviewing and harmonizing the calculation of handicap European amateur players.

Member federations 
The EGA currently comprises 49 member federations. The EGA membership is reserved for national European golf associations, federations or unions, with only one representing the golf activities of its country. Each member federation operates independently in their respective country with regards to their domestic affairs over which the EGA has no jurisdiction.

Member federations are divided into four geographical areas.

World Handicap System 
The World Handicap System (WHS) is a new handicapping system implemented in 2020, which aims to unify the previous six different handicap systems in order to enable golfers to play and compete on a fair and equal basis, regardless of how and where they play. Until 2020, several different handicap systems were operating independently across different regions of the world, all of which were governed by separate bodies. Their different characteristics have sometimes resulted in inconsistency, as a player could have a different handicap depending which country he was registered in.

The WHS is governed by the World Handicap Authority, which features representatives of the six former handicapping bodies (the EGA, the United States Golf Association, the Council of National Golf Unions, Golf Australia, the South African Golf Association and the Argentina Golf Association), and is now jointly run by the United States Golf Association and The R&A.

The EGA is the governing body responsible for the implementation of the World Handicap System in Europe, except the members representing England, Ireland, Scotland and Wales, owing to their membership to the Council of National Golf Unions (CONGU). European golfers are affiliated to the national golf authority in charge in their jurisdiction.

The EGA member federations (excluding CONGU nations) are currently adopting and implementing the WHS in their respective countries. The implementation and oversight of handicapping continues to be the responsibility of each handicapping authority and National Association. Under one handicap system, a player’s handicap can be applicable on any course in the world. The WHS therefore facilitates international competition under one global system, granting players to compare their handicaps with and fairly compete against all registered golfers across the globe.

EGA events 
The EGA coordinates and co-organizes 27 European golf tournaments.

European Individual Championships (8)
European Amateur Championship (1986–)
European Ladies Amateur Championship (1986–)
European Mid-Amateur Men's Championship (1991–)
European Mid-Amateur Ladies' Championship (2019–)
European Senior Men's Championship (1996–)
European Senior Ladies' Championship (1996–)
European Young Masters (1995–)
 European Championships for Disabled Golfers: The EGA collaborates with the European Disabled Golfers Association (EDGA) for the organisation of the event and awards medals to the winners of the championship.

European Team Championships (11)
European Amateur Team Championship (1959–)
European Amateur Team Championship, Division 2 (Formerly named  EGA Men's Challenge Trophy from 2002 to 2013) (2002–)
European Ladies' Team Championship (1959–)
European Boys' Team Championship (1980–)   
European Boys' Team Championship, Division 2 (Formerly named EGA Boys' Challenge Trophy from 2004 to 2013) (2004–)                                            
European Girls' Team Championship (1991–)
European Senior Men's Team Championship (2006–)
European Senior Ladies' Team Championship (2006–)
European Men's Team Shield (2015–)                                                                         
European Ladies' Team Shield (2016–)
 European Team Championships for Disabled Golfers: The EGA collaborates with the European Disabled Golfers Association (EDGA) for the organisation of the event and awards medals to the winners of the championship.

International Matches (6)
Bonallack Trophy
Patsy Hankins Trophy
Vagliano Trophy
Junior Vagliano Trophy
St Andrews Trophy
Jacques Léglise Trophy

Club Trophies (2)
European Men's Club Trophy (1975–)
European Ladies' Club Trophy (2001–)

Others
The EGA is involved is involved in the organisation of the following events:
 Junior Ryder Cup : The EGA collaborates with the European Tour regarding the Junior Ryder Cup European team selection.
 Asia-Pacific Junior Championship: The EGA sends the European Young Masters winners and runners-up of the boys' and girls' categories to compete in the Asia-Pacific Junior Championship. In a reciprocal arrangement, the EGA invites APHC to send up to 4 players to compete in the European Young Masters for the individual titles.

No longer disputed
Former EGA championships has been discontinued:
EGA Trophy (1967–1994)
European Youths' Team Championship (1961–2006)
European Lady Junior's Team Championship (1968–2006)

See also
The R&A

References

External links

Amateur golf
Golf associations
Sports governing bodies in Europe